Alexandra Saduakassova (born 10 September 2002) is a Kazakh sport shooter. She participated at the 2021 World Running Target Championships, winning two gold medals in the women's junior and mixed junior events. Saduakassova lost to Zuhkra Irnazahova in the bronze medal play-off at the 2021 Asian Airgun Championships.

References

External links 

2002 births
Living people
Place of birth missing (living people)
Kazakhstani female sport shooters
Running target shooters
21st-century Kazakhstani women